Elsie Reasoner Ralph (April 25, 1878 – April 29, 1913) was an American war correspondent in Cuba and a sculptor.

The first female war correspondent in US history, Ralph travelled to Cuba to cover the Spanish–American War under the cover story of being a nursing volunteer.

She married Lester Ralph on May 15, 1904, in New York City.

Moving to London, Ralph achieved the sum of $2,650 for a sculpted sundial, circa 1911.

References

1878 births
1913 deaths
American sculptors
American women war correspondents
American expatriates in Cuba
American expatriates in the United Kingdom